The 2013 Milwaukee Brewers season was the 44th season for the Brewers in Milwaukee, the 16th in the National League, and 45th overall.

Regular season

Season standings

National League Central

National League Wild Card

Record vs. opponents

Game log 

|-  align="center" bgcolor="bbffbb"
| 1 || April 1 || Rockies || 5–4 (10) || Henderson (1–0) || Ottavino (0–1) ||  || 45,781 || 1–0
|-  align="center" bgcolor="ffbbbb"
| 2 || April 2 || Rockies || 4–8 || Escalona (1–0) || Gonzalez (0–1) || Betancourt (1)  || 24,753 || 1–1 
|-  align="center" bgcolor="ffbbbb"
| 3 || April 3 || Rockies || 3–7 || Nicasio (1–0) || Peralta (0–1) ||  || 25,766 || 1–2
|-  align="center" bgcolor="ffbbbb"
| 4 || April 5 || Diamondbacks || 1–3 || Miley (0–1) || Badenhop (0–1) || Putz (1) || 24,623 || 1–3
|-  align="center" bgcolor="ffbbbb"
| 5 || April 6 || Diamondbacks || 2–9 || Corbin (1–0) || Fiers (0–1) ||  || 30,115 || 1–4
|-  align="center" bgcolor="ffbbbb"
| 6 || April 7 || Diamondbacks || 7–8 (11) || Sipp (1–0) || Axford (0–1) || Bell (1) || 37,733 || 1–5
|-  align="center" bgcolor="bbffbb"
| 7 || April 8 || @ Cubs || 7–4 || Estrada (1–0) || Jackson (0–2)  || Henderson (1) || 40,083 || 2–5
|-  align="center" bgcolor="ffbbbb"
| 8 || April 9 || @ Cubs || 3–6 || Mármol (1–1) || Axford (0–2) || Fujikawa (2) || 30,065 || 2–6
|-  align="center" bgcolor="bbbbbb"
| – || April 10 || @ Cubs || 7:05pm ||colspan=6| PPD, RAIN; rescheduled for July 30 
|-  align="center" bgcolor="ffbbbb"
| 9 || April 12 || @ Cardinals || 0–2 || Miller (2–0) || Lohse (0–1) || Boggs (2) || 42,528 || 2–7
|-  align="center" bgcolor="ffbbbb"
| 10 || April 13 || @ Cardinals || 0–8 || Wainwright (2–1) || Gallardo (0–1) ||  || 44,696 || 2–8
|-  align="center" bgcolor="bbffbb"
| 11 || April 14 || @ Cardinals || 4–3 (10) || Kintzler (1–0) || Salas (0–2) || Badenhop (1) || 42,645 || 3–8
|-  align="center" bgcolor="bbffbb"
| 12 || April 16 || Giants || 10–8 || Kintzler (2–0) || Zito (2–1) || Henderson (2) || 29,075 || 4–8
|-  align="center" bgcolor="bbffbb"
| 13 || April 17 || Giants || 4–3 || Henderson (2–0) || Casilla (1–1) ||  || 29,362 || 5–8
|-  salign="center" bgcolor="bbffbb"
| 14 || April 18 || Giants || 7–2 || Gallardo (1–1) || Cain (0–2) ||  || 29,161 || 6–8
|-  align="center" bgcolor="bbffbb"
| 15 || April 19 || Cubs || 5–4 || Estrada (2–0) || Samardzija (1–3) || Henderson (3) || 28,346 || 7–8
|-  align="center" bgcolor="bbffbb"
| 16 || April 20 || Cubs || 5–1 || Burgos (1–0) || Jackson (0–3) ||  || 42,230 || 8–8
|-  align="center" bgcolor="bbffbb"
| 17 || April 21 || Cubs || 4–2 || Peralta (1–1) || Feldman (0–3)|| Henderson (4) || 37,123 || 9–8
|-  align="center" bgcolor="bbffbb"
| 18 || April 22 || @ Padres || 7–1 || Lohse (1–1) || Marquis (1–2) ||  || 18,643 || 10–8
|-  align="center" bgcolor="bbffbb"
| 19 || April 23 || @ Padres || 6–3 || Gallardo (2–1) || Richard (0–2) || Henderson (5) || 19,560 || 11–8
|-  align="center" bgcolor="ffbbbb"
| 20 || April 24 || @ Padres || 1–2 || Volquez (1–3) || Estrada (2–1) || Street (3) || 17,205 || 11–9
|-  align="center" bgcolor="ffbbbb"
| 21 || April 26 || @ Dodgers || 5–7 || Belisario (2–2)|| Gonzalez (0–2) || League (7) || 44,930 || 11–10
|-  align="center" bgcolor="bbffbb"
| 22 || April 27 || @ Dodgers || 6–4 || Peralta (2–1) || Guerrier (1–1)  || Henderson (6) || 50,224 || 12–10
|-  align="center" bgcolor="ffbbbb"
| 23 || April 28 || @ Dodgers || 0–2 || Kershaw (3–2) || Lohse (1–2) || League (8) || 49,003 || 12–11
|-  align="center" bgcolor="bbffbb"
| 24 || April 29 || Pirates || 10–4 || Gallaro (3–1) || Rodríguez (2–1) ||  || 21,255 || 13–11
|-  align="center" bgcolor="bbffbb"
| 25 || April 30 || Pirates || 12–8 || Gorzelanny (1–0) || Morris (0–1) ||  || 24,154 || 14–11

|-  align="center" bgcolor="ffbbbb"
| 26 || May 1 || Pirates || 4–6 || Morris (1–1) || Axford (0–3) || Grilli (11) || 26,079 || 14–12
|-  align="center" bgcolor="ffbbbb"
| 27 || May 2 || Cardinals || 5–6 || Westbrook (2–1) || Peralta (2–2) || Mujica (7) || 22,204 || 14–13
|-  align="center" bgcolor="ffbbbb"
| 28 || May 3 || Cardinals || 1–6 || Miller (4–2) || Lohse (1–3) ||  || 40,068 || 14–14
|-  align="center" bgcolor="ffbbbb"
| 29 || May 4 || Cardinals || 6–7 || Maness (1–0) || Henderson (2–1) || Mujica (8) || 36,156 || 14–15
|-  align="center" bgcolor="ffbbbb"
| 30 || May 5 || Cardinals || 1–10 || García (4–1) || Estrada (2–2) ||  || 38,620 || 14–16
|-  align="center" bgcolor="bbffbb"
| 31 || May 7 || Rangers || 6–3 || Peralta (3–2) || Grimm (2–2) || Henderson (7) || 22,467 || 15–16
|-  align="center" bgcolor="ffbbbb"
| 32 || May 8 || Rangers || 1–4 || Holland (3–2) || Lohse (1–4) || Nathan (9) || 22,616 || 15–17
|-  align="center" bgcolor="ffbbbb"
| 33 || May 10 || @ Reds || 3–4 || Simón (3–1) || Gallardo (3–2) || Chapman (8) || 33,251 || 15–18
|-  align="center" bgcolor="ffbbbb"
| 34 || May 11 || @ Reds || 7–13 || Latos (4–0) || Burgos (1–1) ||  || 41,678 || 15–19
|-  align="center" bgcolor="ffbbbb"
| 35 || May 12 || @ Reds || 1–5 || Arroyo (3–4) || Peralta (3–3) ||  || 38,813 || 15–20
|-  align="center" bgcolor="bbffbb"
| 36 || May 13 || @ Pirates || 5–1 || Estrada (3–2) || Burnett (3–4) ||  || 11,872 || 16–20
|-  align="center" bgcolor="ffbbbb"
| 37 || May 14 || @ Pirates || 3–4 (12) || Mazzaro (2–0) || Fiers (0–2) ||  || 11,556 || 16–21
|-  align="center" bgcolor="ffbbbb"
| 38 || May 15 || @ Pirates || 1–3 || Rodríguez  (4–2) || Gallardo (3–3) || Grilli (16) || 13,554 || 16–22
|-  align="center" bgcolor="ffbbbb"
| 39 || May 16 || @ Pirates || 1–7 || Liriano (2–0) || Burgos (1–2) ||  || 16,434 || 16–23
|-  align="center" bgcolor="ffbbbb"
| 40 || May 17 || @ Cardinals || 6–7 || García (5–2) || Peralta (3–4) || Mujica (12) || 39,426 || 16–24
|-  align="center" bgcolor="bbffbb"
| 41 || May 18 || @ Cardinals || 6–4 (10) || Axford (1–3) || Kelly (0–2) || Henderson (8) || 42,410 || 17–24
|-  align="center" bgcolor="ffbbbb"
| 42 || May 19 || @ Cardinals || 2–4 || Gast (2–0) || Lohse (1–5) || Mujica (13) || 39,878 || 17–25
|-  align="center" bgcolor="ffbbbb"
| 43 || May 20 || Dodgers || 1–3 || Kershaw (5–2) || Gallardo (3–4) ||  || 28,287 || 17–26
|-  align="center" bgcolor="bbffbb"
| 44 || May 21 || Dodgers || 5–2 || Fiers (1–2) || Greinke (2–1) || Henderson (9) || 26,384 || 18–26 
|-  align="center" bgcolor="ffbbbb"
| 45 || May 22 || Dodgers || 2–9 || Ryu (5–2) || Peralta (3–5) ||  || 36,963 || 18–27
|-  align="center" bgcolor="bbffbb"
| 46 || May 24 || Pirates || 2–1 || Estrada (4–2) || Burnett (3–5) || Rodríguez (1) || 33,874 || 19–27
|-  align="center" bgcolor="ffbbbb"
| 47 || May 25 || Pirates || 2–5 || Locke (5–1) || Fiers (1–3) ||  || 40,410  || 19–28
|-  align="center" bgcolor="ffbbbb"
| 48 || May 26 || Pirates || 4–5 || Rodríguez (6–2) || Gallardo (3–5) || Grilli (20) || 44,626 || 19–29
|-  align="center" bgcolor="ffbbbb"
| 49 || May 27 || Twins || 3–6 || Correia (5–4) || Peralta (3–6) || Perkins (10) || 38,627 || 19–30
|-  align="center" bgcolor="ffbbbb"
| 50 || May 28 || Twins || 5–6 (14) || Pressly (2–0) || Badenhop (0–2) || Duensing (1) || 24,415 || 19–31
|-  align="center" bgcolor="ffbbbb"
| 51 || May 29 || @ Twins || 1–4 || Deduno (1–1) || Estrada (4–3) || Perkins (11) || 31,359 || 19–32
|-  align="center" bgcolor="ffbbbb"
| 52 || May 30 || @ Twins || 6–8 || Walters (2–0) || Lohse (1–6) || Burton (2) || 32,688 || 19–33
|-  align="center" bgcolor="bbffbb"
| 53 || May 31 || @ Phillies || 8–5 || Gallardo (4–5) || Hamels (1–9) || Rodríguez (2) || 37,420 || 20–33

|-  align="center" bgcolor="bbffbb"
| 54 || June 1 || @ Phillies || 4–3 || Peralta (4–6) || Cloyd (1–2) || Rodríguez (3) || 41,114 || 21–33
|-  align="center" bgcolor="ffbbbb"
| 55 || June 2 || @ Phillies || 5–7 || Lee (7–2) || Fiers (1–4) || Bastardo (1) || 40,613 || 21–34
|-  align="center" bgcolor="ffbbbb"
| 56 || June 3 || Athletics || 2–10 || Milone (6–5) || Estrada (4–4) ||  || 21,023 || 21–35
|-  align="center" bgcolor="bbffbb"
| 57 || June 4 || Athletics || 4–3 (10) || Axford (2–3) || Neshek (1–1) ||  || 24,230 || 22–35
|-  align="center" bgcolor="ffbbbb"
| 58 || June 5 || Athletics || 1–6 || Colón (7–2) || Gallardo (4–6) ||  || 25,912 || 22–36
|-  align="center" bgcolor="ffbbbb"
| 59 || June 6 || Phillies || 1–5 || Cloyd (2–2) || Peralta (4–7) ||  || 21,581 || 22–37
|-  align="center" bgcolor="bbffbb"
| 60 || June 7 || Phillies || 5–4 || Rodríguez (1–0) || Horst (0–2) ||  || 31,417 || 23–37
|-  align="center" bgcolor="bbffbb"
| 61 || June 8 || Phillies || 4–3 || Thornburg (1–0) || Kendrick (6–4) || Rodríguez (4) || 38,267 || 24–37
|-  align="center" bgcolor="bbffbb"
| 62 || June 9 || Phillies || 9–1 || Lohse (2–6) || Pettibone (3–2) ||  || 38,300 || 25–37
|-  align="center" bgcolor="bbffbb"
| 63 || June 10 || @ Marlins || 6–1 || Gallardo (5–6) || Nolasco (3–7) ||  || 13,259 || 26–37
|-  align="center" bgcolor="ffbbbb"
| 64 || June 11 || @ Marlins || 4–5 || Qualls (2–0) || Henderson (2–2) || Cishek (7) || 13,110 || 26–38
|-  align="center" bgcolor="bbffbb"
| 65 || June 12 || @ Marlins || 10–1 || Fígaro (1–0) || Slowey (2–6) ||  || 13,468 || 27–38
|-  align="center" bgcolor="ffbbbb"
| 66 || June 14 || @ Reds || 3–4 (10) || Simón (5–2) || Badenhop (0–3) ||  || 35,138 || 27–39
|-  align="center" bgcolor="bbffbb"
| 67 || June 15 || @ Reds || 6–0 || Gallardo (6–6) || Bailey (4–5) ||  || 37,519 || 28–39
|-  align="center" bgcolor="ffbbbb"
| 68 || June 16 || @ Reds || 1–5 || Cueto (4–0) || Peralta (4–8) || Simón (1) || 39,088 || 28–40
|-  align="center" bgcolor="ffbbbb"
| 69 || June 18 || @ Astros || 1–10 || Lyles (4–1) || Figaro (1–1) ||  || 13,330 || 28–41
|-  align="center" bgcolor="bbffbb"
| 70 || June 19 || @ Astros || 3–1 || Axford (3–3) || Ambriz (1–4) || Rodríguez (5) || 15,866 || 29–41
|-  align="center" bgcolor="ffbbbb"
| 71 || June 20 || @ Astros || 4–7 (10) || Ambriz (2–4) || Gonzalez (0–3) ||  || 17,803 || 29–42
|-  align="center" bgcolor="bbffbb"
| 72 || June 21 || Braves || 2–0 || Peralta (5–8) || Teherán (5–4) || Henderson (10) || 32,594 || 30–42
|-  align="center" bgcolor="bbffbb"
| 73 || June 22 || Braves || 2–0 || Badenhop (1–3) || Hudson (4–7) || Rodríguez (6, career #300) || 41,974 || 31–42
|-  align="center" bgcolor="ffbbbb"
| 74 || June 23 || Braves || 4–7 || Maholm (8–6) || Figaro (1–2) || Kimbrel (21) || 41,221 || 31–43
|-  align="center" bgcolor="bbffbb"
| 75 || June 25 || Cubs || 9–3 || Lohse (3–6) || Jackson (3–10) ||  || 30,172 || 32–43
|-  align="center" bgcolor="ffbbbb"
| 76 || June 26 || Cubs || 4–5 || Feldman (7–6) || Gallardo (6–7) || Gregg (12) || 28,061 || 32–44
|-  align="center" bgcolor="ffbbbb"
| 77 || June 27 || Cubs || 2–7 || Garza (3–1) || Peralta (5–9) ||  || 31,792 || 32–45
|-  align="center" bgcolor="ffbbbb"
| 78 || June 28 || @ Pirates || 3–10 || Cole (4–0) || Hellweg (0–1) || Reid (1) || 36,875 || 32–46
|-  align="center" bgcolor="ffbbbb"
| 79 || June 29 || @ Pirates || 1–2 || Liriano (7–3) || Hand (0–1)  || Grilli (27) || 38,438 || 32–47
|-  align="center" bgcolor="ffbbbb"
| 80 || June 30 || @ Pirates || 1–2 (14) || Watson (2–1) || Rodríguez (1–1) ||  || 35,351 || 32–48

|-  align="center" bgcolor="ffbbbb"
| 81 || July 1 || @ Nationals || 5–10 || Zimmermann (12–3) || Gallardo (6–8) ||  || 24,889 || 32–49 
|-  align="center" bgcolor="bbffbb"
| 82 || July 2 || @ Nationals || 4–0 || Henderson (3–2) || Storen (2–2) ||  || 24,897 || 33–49
|-  align="center" bgcolor="bbffbb"
| 83 || July 3 || @ Nationals || 4–1 || Lohse (4–6) || Detwiler (2–7) || Rodríguez (7) || 28,920 || 34–49
|-  align="center" bgcolor="ffbbbb"
| 84 || July 4 || @ Nationals || 5–8 || Storen (3–2) || Gorzelanny (1–1) || Soriano (22) || 38,221 || 34–50
|-  align="center" bgcolor="ffbbbb"
| 85 || July 5 || Mets || 5–12 || Wheeler (2–1) || Hellweg (0–2) || Edgin (1) || 32,519 || 34–51
|-  align="center" bgcolor="bbffbb"
| 86 || July 6 || Mets || 7–6 || Gallardo (7–8) || Marcum (1–10) || Rodríguez (8) || 31,619 || 35–51
|-  align="center" bgcolor="ffbbbb"
| 87 || July 7 || Mets || 1–2 || Hefner (4–6) || Gorzelanny (1–2) || Parnell (15) || 39,677 || 35–52
|-  align="center" bgcolor="bbffbb"
| 88 || July 8 || Reds || 4–3 || Lohse (5–6) || Bailey (5–7) || Rodríguez (9) || 25,341 || 36–52
|-  align="center" bgcolor="bbffbb"
| 89 || July 9 || Reds || 2–0 || Peralta (6–9) || Cingrani (3–1) ||  || 25,369 || 37–52
|-  align="center" bgcolor="ffbbbb"
| 90 || July 10 || Reds || 2–6 || Leake (8–4) || Hellweg (0–3) ||  || 35,239 || 37–53
|-  align="center" bgcolor="ffbbbb"
| 91 || July 11 || @ Diamondbacks || 3–5 || Miley (6–7) || Henderson (3–3) || Ziegler (2) || 17,531 || 37–54 
|-  align="center" bgcolor="ffbbbb"
| 92 || July 12 || @ Diamondbacks || 1–2 || Corbin (11–1) || Gorzelanny (1–3) || Hernandez (2) || 19,681 || 37–55
|-  align="center" bgcolor="ffbbbb"
| 93 || July 13 || @ Diamondbacks || 4–5 || Harris (2–0) || Lohse (5–7) || Ziegler (3) || 33,566 || 37–56
|-  align="center" bgcolor="bbffbb"
| 94 || July 14 || @ Diamondbacks || 5–1 || Peralta (7–9) || Kennedy (3–6)  ||  || 25,057 || 38–56
|-  align="center" bgcolor="bbffbb"
| 95 || July 19 || Marlins || 2–0 || Lohse (6–7) || Turner (3–2) || Rodríguez (10) || 30,316 || 39–56
|-  align="center" bgcolor="bbffbb"
| 96 || July 20 || Marlins || 6–0 || Gallardo (8–8) || Eovaldi (2–1) ||  || 37,446 || 40–56
|-  align="center" bgcolor="bbffbb"
| 97 || July 21 || Marlins || 1–0 (13) || Axford (4–3) || Webb (1–4) ||  || 30,073 || 41–56
|-  align="center" bgcolor="ffbbbb"
| 98 || July 22 || Padres || 3–5 || Cashner (6–5) || Gorzelanny (1–4) || Street (17) || 30,348 || 41–57
|-  align="center" bgcolor="ffbbbb"
| 99 || July 23 || Padres || 2–6 || Ross (1–4) || Hand (0–2) ||  || 28,242 || 41–58
|-  align="center" bgcolor="bbffbb"
| 100 || July 24 || Padres || 3–1 || Lohse (7–7) || O'Sullivan (0–2) || Henderson (11) || 25,551 || 42–58
|-  align="center" bgcolor="ffbbbb"
| 101 || July 25 || Padres || 8–10 || Volquez (8–8) || Gallardo (8–9) || Street (18) || 34,372 || 42–59
|-  align="center" bgcolor="ffbbbb"
| 102 || July 26 || @ Rockies || 3–8 || Chatwood (7–3) || Peralta (7–10) ||  || 32,740 || 42–60
|-  align="center" bgcolor="bbffbb"
| 103 || July 27 || @ Rockies || 7–5 || Gorzelanny (2–4) || McHugh (0–2) || Henderson (12) || 38,012 || 43–60
|-  align="center" bgcolor="ffbbbb"
| 104 || July 28 || @ Rockies || 5–6 || Belisle (5–5) || Axford (4–4) || Brothers (7) || 33,237  || 43–61
|-  align="center" bgcolor="bbffbb"
| 105 || July 29 || @ Cubs || 5–0 || Kintzler (3–0) || Strop (1–1) ||  || 32,848 || 44–61
|-  align="center" bgcolor="bbffbb"
| 106 || July 30 || @ Cubs || 6–5 || Wooten (1–0) || Russell (1–3) || Henderson (13) || 34,996 || 45–61
|-  align="center" bgcolor="bbffbb"
| 107 || July 30 || @ Cubs || 3–2 || Badenhop (2–3) || Gregg (2–3) || Henderson (14) || 31,638 || 46–61
|-  align="center" bgcolor="ffbbbb"
| 108 || July 31 || @ Cubs || 1–6 || Jackson (7–11) || Peralta (7–11) ||  || 29,817 || 46–62

|-  align="center" bgcolor="ffbbbb"
| 109 || August 2 || Nationals || 1–4 || Zimmermann (13–6) || Figaro (1–3) || Soriano (27) || 34,824 || 46–63
|-  align="center" bgcolor="ffbbbb"
| 110 || August 3 || Nationals || 0–3 || Haren (6–11) || Hand (0–3) || Soriano (28) || 35,690 || 46–64
|-  align="center" bgcolor="bbffbb"
| 111 || August 4 || Nationals || 8–5 || Axford (5–4) || Abad (0–3) || Henderson (15) || 35,055 || 47–64
|-  align="center" bgcolor="ffbbbb"
| 112 || August 5 || @ Giants || 2–4 || Casilla (5–2) || Axford (5–5) || Romo (27)  || 42,217 || 47–65
|-  align="center" bgcolor="bbffbb"
| 113 || August 6 || @ Giants || 3–1 || Peralta (8–11) || Cain (7–7) || Henderson (16) || 41,426 || 48–65
|-  align="center" bgcolor="bbffbb"
| 114 || August 7 || @ Giants || 6–1 || Figaro (2–3) || Bumgarner (11–7) ||  || 41,416 || 49–65
|-  align="center" bgcolor="ffbbbb"
| 115 || August 8 || @ Giants || 1–4 || Lincecum (6–11) || Hand (0–4) ||  || 41,219 || 49–66
|-  align="center" bgcolor="bbffbb"
| 116 || August 9 || @ Mariners || 10–5 || Lohse (8–7) || Saunders (10–11) ||  || 34,827 || 50–66
|-  align="center" bgcolor="bbffbb"
| 117 || August 10 || @ Mariners || 10–0 || Gorzelanny (3–4) || Iwakuma (10–6) ||  || 46,027 || 51–66
|-  align="center" bgcolor="ffbbbb"
| 118 || August 11 || @ Mariners || 0–2 || Hernández (12–5) || Peralta (8–12) || Farquhar (4) || 25,390 || 51–67
|-  align="center" bgcolor="bbffbb"
| 119 || August 13 || @ Rangers || 5–1 || Estrada (5–4) || Ogando (5–4) || Henderson (17) || 38,516 || 52–67
|-  align="center" bgcolor="ffbbbb"
| 120 || August 14 || @ Rangers || 4–5 || Frasor (4–2) || Axford (5–6) || Nathan (36) || 37,729 || 52–68
|-  align="center" bgcolor="ffbbbb"
| 121 || August 15 || Reds || 1–2 || Cingrani (6–2) || Lohse (8–8) || Chapman (30) || 36,076 || 52–69
|-  align="center" bgcolor="bbffbb"
| 122 || August 16 || Reds || 7–6 || Axford (6–6) || Chapman (3–5) ||  ||  33,037 || 53–69
|-  align="center" bgcolor="bbffbb"
| 123 || August 17 || Reds || 2–0 || Gallardo (9–9) || Latos (12–4) || Henderson (18) || 37,046 || 54–69
|-  align="center" bgcolor="ffbbbb"
| 124 || August 18 || Reds || 1–9 || Bailey (8–10) || Peralta (8–13) ||  || 34,175 || 54–70
|-  align="center" bgcolor="ffbbbb"
| 125 || August 19 || Cardinals || 5–8 || Wacha (2–0) || Kintzler (3–1) || Mujica (32) || 32,972 || 54–71
|-  align="center" bgcolor="bbffbb"
| 126 || August 20 || Cardinals || 6–3 || Lohse (9–8) || Lynn (13–7) || Henderson (19) || 38,093 || 55–71
|-  align="center" bgcolor="ffbbbb"
| 127 || August 21 || Cardinals || 6–8 || Siegrist (2–1) || Gorzelanny (3–5) || Mujica (33) || 37,028 || 55–72
|-  align="center" bgcolor="bbffbb"
| 128 || August 23 || @ Reds || 6–4 || Wooten (2–0) || Simón (5–4) || Henderson (20) || 34,230 || 56–72
|-  align="center" bgcolor="ffbbbb"
| 129 || August 24 || @ Reds || 3–6 || Arroyo (13–9) || Axford (6–7) || Chapman (33) || 33,430 || 56–73
|-  align="center" bgcolor="bbffbb"
| 130 || August 25 || @ Reds || 3–1 || Estrada (6–4) || Reynolds (0–2) || Henderson (21) || 33,743 || 57–73
|-  align="center" bgcolor="bbffbb"
| 131 || August 27 || @ Pirates || 7–6 || Wooten (3–0) || Morris (5–7) || Henderson (22) || 23,801 || 58–73
|-  align="center" bgcolor="ffbbbb"
| 132 || August 28 || @ Pirates || 1–7 || Morton (6–3) || Gorzelanny (3–6) ||  || 20,634 || 58–74
|-  align="center" bgcolor="bbffbb"
| 133 || August 29 || @ Pirates || 4–0 || Gallardo (10–9) || Cole (6–7) ||  || 23,747 || 59–74
|-  align="center" bgcolor="ffbbbb"
| 134 || August 30 || Angels || 0–5 || Weaver (9–7) || Peralta (8–14) ||  || 32,340 || 59–75
|-  align="center" bgcolor="ffbbbb"
| 135 || August 31 || Angels || 5–6 || De La Rosa (6–1) || Henderson (3–4) || Frieri (29) || 28,175 || 59–76

|-  align="center" bgcolor="ffbbbb"
| 136 || September 1 || Angels || 3–5 || Wilson (14–6) || Wooten (3–1) || Frieri (30) || 29,733 || 59–77
|-  align="center" bgcolor="ffbbbb"
| 137 || September 2 || Pirates || 2–5 || Morton (7–3) || Thornburg (1–1) || Melancon (10) || 23,252 || 59–78
|-  align="center" bgcolor="ffbbbb"
| 138 || September 3 || Pirates || 3–4 || Mazzaro (7–2) || Henderson (3–5) || Melancon (11) || 25,558 || 59–79
|-  align="center" bgcolor="bbffbb"
| 139 || September 4 || Pirates || 9–3 || Peralta (9–14) || Liriano (15–7) ||  || 29,041 || 60–79
|-  align="center" bgcolor="ffbbbb"
| 140 || September 6 || @ Cubs || 5–8 || Villanueva (5–8) || Lohse (9–9) || Gregg (30) || 25,351 || 60–80
|-  align="center" bgcolor="bbffbb"
| 141 || September 7 || @ Cubs || 5–3 || Hellweg (1–3) || Arrieta (3–4) || Henderson (23) || 34,929 || 61–80
|-  align="center" bgcolor="bbffbb"
| 142 || September 8 || @ Cubs || 3–1 || Gallardo (11–9) || Grimm (7–8) || Henderson (24) || 27,802 || 62–80
|-  align="center" bgcolor="ffbbbb"
| 143 || September 10 || @ Cardinals || 2–4 || Miller (13–9) || Peralta (9–15) ||  || 35,050 || 62–81
|-  align="center" bgcolor="ffbbbb"
| 144 || September 11 || @ Cardinals || 1–5 || Rosenthal (2–3) || Kintzler (3–2) ||  || 35,134 || 62–82
|-  align="center" bgcolor="bbffbb"
| 145 || September 12 || @ Cardinals || 5–3 || Thornburg (2–1) || Kelly (8–4) || Henderson (25) || 35,208 || 63–82
|-  align="center" bgcolor="bbffbb"
| 146 || September 13 || Reds || 5–1 || Lohse (10–9) || Latos (14–6) ||  || 39,665 || 64–82
|-  align="center" bgcolor="ffbbbb"
| 147 || September 14 || Reds || 3–7 || Bailey (11–10) || Hellweg (1–4) || Chapman (36) || 25,929 || 64–83
|-  align="center" bgcolor="bbffbb"
| 148 || September 15 || Reds || 6–5 || Henderson (4–5) || Duke (1–2) ||  || 26,725 || 65–83
|-  align="center" bgcolor="bbffbb"
| 149 || September 16 || Cubs || 6–1 || Peralta (10–15) || Jackson (8–16) ||  || 24,464 || 66–83
|-  align="center" bgcolor="bbffbb"
| 150 || September 17 || Cubs || 4–3 || Henderson (5–5) || Grimm (7–9) ||  || 22,506 || 67–83
|-  align="center" bgcolor="bbffbb"
| 151 || September 18 || Cubs || 7–0 || Thornburg (3–1) || Rusin (2–5) ||  || 24,632 || 68–83
|-  align="center" bgcolor="ffbbbb"
| 152 || September 19 || Cubs || 1–5 || Arrieta (4–4) || Lohse (10–10) ||  || 21,625 || 68–84
|-  align="center" bgcolor="ffbbbb"
| 153 || September 20 || Cardinals || 6–7 (10) || Axford (7–7) || Blazek (0–1) || Martínez (1) || 37,148 || 68–85
|-  align="center" bgcolor="ffbbbb"
| 154 || September 21 || Cardinals || 2–7 || Lynn (14–10) || Gallardo (11–10) ||  || 35,008 || 68–86
|-  align="center" bgcolor="bbffbb"
| 155 || September 22 || Cardinals || 6–4 || Peralta (11–15) || Kelly (9–5) || Henderson (26) || 27,389 || 69–86
|-  align="center" bgcolor="bbffbb"
| 156 || September 23 || @ Braves || 5–0 || Estrada (7–4) || Minor (13–8) ||  || 19,893 || 70–86
|-  align="center" bgcolor="ffbbbb"
| 157 || September 24 || @ Braves || 2–3 || Kimbrel (4–3) || Hand (0–5) ||  || 22,605 || 70–87
|-  align="center" bgcolor="bbffbb"
| 158 || September 25 || @ Braves || 4–0 || Lohse (11–10) || Maholm (10–11) ||  || 19,558 || 71–87
|-  align="center" bgcolor="bbffbb"
| 159 || September 26 || @ Mets || 4–2 || Fígaro (3–3) || Gee (12–11) || Henderson (27) || 21,350 || 72–87
|-  align="center" bgcolor="bbffbb"
| 160 || September 27 || @ Mets || 4–2 || Gallardo (12–10) || Torres (4–6) || Henderson (28) || 25,276 || 73–87
|-  align="center" bgcolor="bbffbb"
| 161 || September 28 || @ Mets || 4–2 (10) || Hand (1–5) || Atchison (3–3) || Fígaro (1) || 29,326 || 74–87
|-  align="center" bgcolor="ffbbbb"
| 162 || September 29 || @ Mets || 2–3 || Black (3–0) || Kintzler (3–3) || Francisco (1) || 41,891 || 74–88

|

Roster

Farm system

The Brewers' farm system consisted of seven minor league affiliates in 2013.

References

External links

2013 Milwaukee Brewers season at Baseball Reference
2013 Milwaukee Brewers season Official Site 

Milwaukee Brewers seasons
Milwaukee Brewers
Milwaukee Brewers